Goshen is an unincorporated area and abandoned settlement in Henderson County, Texas, United States. Its location was described as "on Trim Creek eight miles northeast of Eustace in northwestern Henderson County." There is a cemetery there with about 450 graves.

See also
 Goshen

References

Geography of Henderson County, Texas
Unincorporated communities in Texas
Former populated places in Texas
Cemeteries in Texas